California Street is a major thoroughfare in San Francisco, California. It is one of the longest streets in San Francisco, and includes a number of important landmarks.

Description
California Street begins at the intersection of Market Street, Main Street, and Drumm Street in front of the Hyatt Regency Embarcadero Center, one block from the Ferry Building, then travels through Chinatown, over Nob Hill, through Lower Pacific Heights, Laurel Heights, and the Lake District.  The street makes a slight bend at 8th Avenue, then parallels the edge of the Presidio of San Francisco through the Richmond District until its dead end terminus just west of 32nd Avenue, at Lincoln Park.

Fifty-four blocks of California Street, from Van Ness Avenue westward to the dead end past 32nd Avenue, comprised the last major leg of the final 1928 alignment of the Lincoln Highway, the first road across America, leading out to the highway's western terminus in Lincoln Park.

The route has four to six lanes for its entire length. A cable car line runs on the eastern portion from Market to Van Ness Avenue and a trolleybus line runs on the western portion between Steiner and 32nd Avenue.

Landmarks and points of interest

 Embarcadero Center
 50 California Street
 101 California Street
 150 California Street
 345 California Center (Loews Regency San Francisco)
 400 California Street (Bank of California Building)
 465 California Street (Merchants Exchange Building)
 555 California Street (Bank of America Center)
 580 California Street
 650 California Street (Hartford Building)
Sing Chong and Sing Fat buildings at Grant and California, in Chinatown
 600 Stockton (Ritz Carlton hotel)
 905 California Street (Stanford Court Hotel)
 800 Powell Street (University Club)
 Fairmont Hotel
 999 California Street (Mark Hopkins Hotel )
 1000 California Street (Pacific-Union Club), the former Flood Mansion
 1075 California Street (Huntington Hotel)
 1111 California Street (Masonic Auditorium)
 Huntington Park
 Grace Cathedral
 California Pacific Medical Center

In popular culture  

Two novels are named for San Francisco’s California Street: California Street (1959) by Niven Busch, which documents the rise of a publishing magnate; and California Street (1990) by Donna Levin. Levin's novel is the story of a psychoanalyst searching for a missing woman. Both novels use "California Street" as a metaphor for the milieu in which the stories unfold.

See also
Cable car (railway)
Fillmore District
San Francisco Municipal Railway

External links

Streets in San Francisco
History of San Francisco
Lincoln Highway
Chinatown, San Francisco
Nob Hill, San Francisco